The Cabinet of the Republic of the Congo governs the nation.

The current government is that of Anatole Collinet Makosso which has been in place since 15 May 2021.

References 

Government of the Republic of the Congo